{{Infobox Chinese|c=難兄難弟之神探李奇|l="Difficult Older Brother, Difficult Younger Brother-Detective Lee Kei"|j=naan4 hing1 naan4 dai6 zi1 san1 taam1 lei5 kei4|p=nàn xiōng nàn dì zhī shén tàn lǐ qí}}Old Time Buddy: To Catch a Thief (literally "Difficult Older Brother, Difficult Younger Brother-Detective Lee Kei") is a 1998 Hong Kong period romantic comedy television drama created and produced by TVB, starring Gallen Lo, Gordon Lam, Maggie Cheung, Elaine Ng as the main cast. The series is an indirect sequel to 1997's Old Time Buddy. Filming took place in early 1998 entirely on location in Hong Kong. Original broadcast began on Hong Kong's TVB Jade channel August 3 till September 4, 1998 every Monday through Friday during its 7:30 to 8:30 pm timeslot with a total of 25 episodes.

Although it is the second installment of the Old Time Buddy series the story and characters have no connections to the first series. While the first series focuses on Hong Kong film industry in the 1960s, the second series is adapted from plots of 1960s Hong Kong detective mystery films such as The Black Rose (1965) starring the real life Connie Chan.

Synopsis
Lee Kei is a righteous cop in Hong Kong during the 1960s, a rarity among his peers. He goes undercover to find the infamous cat-burglar "Black Rose", who has escaped capture for over twenty years. His first clue leads him to a nightclub, where he is reunited with Tse Sei, a slick talent manager and Kei's former classmate. Sei is in some trouble for not having paid the triad's talent their fee so Kei allows him to stay with him.

Later, Kei's corrupt supervisor discovers Kei's undercover operation. He gives Kei one month to find the "Black Rose" or he will fire him. When Kei returns home, he finds it burnt down by the triads, who were looking for Sei. Having caused all this trouble, Sei lets Kei live at his uncle's home. Sei's uncle works at an amusement park and live together with all the employees in the same apartment. The other tenants include brassy girl Siu Fong-fong, who tends the coin toss game booth at the park, and martial artists Cheng Po-chu and her mother. At the amusement park, Kei finds similarities between Cheng's acts and the martial arts used by the "Black Rose". He suspects that Cheng's mother is the "Black Rose" and decides to keep a close eye on the duo.

Cast

Main cast
Gallen Lo as Lee Kei (李奇) - based on Lui Kei 呂奇Gordon Lam as Tse Sei (謝四) - based on Patrick Tse 謝賢 whose nickname is Sei Gor 四哥Maggie Cheung Ho-yee as Cheng Po-chu (程寶珠) - based on Connie Chan 陳寶珠Elaine Ng as Siu Fong-fong (邵芳芳) - based on Josephine Siao 蕭芳芳Chung apartment tenants
Chow Chung as Siu Chung (邵聰)
Suet Nei as Ching Seung-seung (程雙雙)
Kingdom Yuen as Ng Yan-lai (吳恩麗) - based on Ng Kwun-lai 吳君麗Chun Wong as Tse Ping (謝平)
Jerry Lamb as Siu Ka-ming (邵家明) - based on James Wong 黃霑Jay Leung as "Lulu" Leung Kum-dai (梁金娣)
Rachel Poon as Ng Yim-fong (吳艷芳) - based on Ann Mui 梅愛芳Gladys Ho as Ng Oi-fong (吳愛芳) - based on Anita Mui 梅艷芳Hong Kong Police
Gregory Charles Rivers as Officer Sze (史sir)
Choi Kwok-Hing as Lok Kung (駱恭)
Annabelle Lau as Lok Bik-gei (駱碧姬)
Felix Lok as Lui King (雷勁) - based on Lui Lok 呂樂Wilson Tsui as Ngan Bun (顏彬)

Extended cast
Joyce Tang as Lina Yiu (姚麗娜)
Ken Lok as Robert
Ben Wong as Tang Hong-wing (鄧康榮) - based on Alan Tang 鄧光榮Kwan Ching as Yu Siu-yuen (于小元) - based on Yu Jim-yuen 于占元
Chiu Hung as Snake Man (蛇佬)
Man Kit-wan as Lai Jan (麗珍)
Wong San as Chan Lo-shu (陳老鼠)
Cheung Ying-choi as Chan Chung-shu (陳松鼠)
Yu Ming as Uncle Lam (林伯)
Samson Yeung as Teacher Komuro (小室老師) - based on Tetsuya Komuro (小室哲哉)
Kwok Fung as Tang Gin (鄧堅)
Johnson Law as White Clouds (白雲)
Pak Yan as Black Wildcat (黑野貓)
Lily Leung as Wong Ang (黃鶯)
Fung So-bo as Female killer 女殺手
Helena Law as Muk Lan-fa (木蘭花)
Lily Li as Muk Sau-jan (木秀珍)
Celia Sie as Ding Ling (丁鈴)

Development and casting
A sequel to 1997 Old Time Buddy was created due to high ratings and positive reception of the first series. However the sequel was poorly received with low ratings and the series was not continued.
The role of Tse Yuen/Sei originated by Francis Ng was re-cast with Gordon Lam, as Ng had left TVB to concentrate on film roles.
The role of Siu Fong-fong originated by Jessica Hsuan was re-cast with Elaine Ng, as Hsuan had an infamous fall out with Maggie Cheung during the filming of the first series.

References

External links
Official website 

TVB dramas
1998 Hong Kong television series debuts
1998 Hong Kong television series endings
Hong Kong comedy television series
Hong Kong romance television series
Television series set in the 1960s
Mystery television series
1990s Hong Kong television series
1990s romance television series